Yağləvənd or Yaglevend or Yaglyvend may refer to:
Aşağı Yağləvənd, Azerbaijan
Yuxarı Yağlıvənd
Yaglivend, Azerbaijan